The  was an electric multiple unit (EMU) train type first built 1964, which operated as 3-car sets on the Tokyo Metro Chiyoda Line branchline in Tokyo, Japan until 2014. 10-car sets were used on the Tokyo Metro Tōzai Line until March 2007. Set 5109,5816,5817 have also been shipped to Indonesia, where they operate on the Kereta Commuter Indonesia system in Jakarta.

Chiyoda Line 3-car sets
Until 30 May 2014, two three-cars sets were in operation, sets 61 and 62. These two aluminium-bodied sets were used on the Chiyoda Line branch between Ayase and Kita-Ayase, and were formed as shown below.

Cars 2 and 3 were each fitted with one single-arm pantograph.

Tozai Line 10-car sets
Ten-car 5000 series sets operated on the Tokyo Metro Tozai Line from December 1964 until March 2007. They were also used on the JR Chuo-Sobu Line between Nakano Station and Mitaka Station, between Nishi-Funabashi Station and Tsudanuma Station (weekday mornings and evenings only), and on the Tōyō Rapid Line between Nishi-Funabashi Station and Tōyō-Katsutadai Station.

Later sets had aluminium bodies.

Interior

Other operators

Toyo Rapid Railway
Ten former Tozai Line sets were converted in 1995 to Tōyō Rapid 1000 series EMUs for use on the Tōyō Rapid Railway extension of the Tozai Line.

Indonesia
Three former Tozai Line ten-car sets (5809, 5816, and 5817) were shipped to Indonesia in 2007, entering service with KRL Jabotabek (now Kereta Commuter Indonesia) in the Jakarta area from January 2007. Since 2020, they have been replaced by the 205 series.

The three sets were each reduced to eight-car formations on arrival in Indonesia. Set 5816 was withdrawn in September 2014.

Of the two remaining sets, set 5817 was lengthened to ten cars in July 2017 with the addition of two intermediate cars from former Toyo Rapid 1000 series set 1091.

Set 5817 finally ended their final operation in Jakarta in January 2020. Although the set was not scrapped and was stationary in Depok Baru Station station until it was withdrawn and grounded at Pasirbungur Station in 27 January 2022.

Four days before the set 5817 delivery, trainset numbers 5809 has been also grounded at Pasirbungur Station in 23 January 2022, ending the career of all Tokyo Metro 5000 Series in Indonesia.

Preserved examples
 Car 5833 in Shin-Suna Ayumi Park, Koto, Tokyo

References

External links

 Tokyo Metro Chiyoda Line 5000/6000 series information 

Electric multiple units of Japan
5000 series
Electric multiple units of Indonesia
Train-related introductions in 1964
1500 V DC multiple units of Japan
Kawasaki multiple units
Nippon Sharyo multiple units
Kinki Sharyo multiple units
Tokyu Car multiple units
Teikoku Sharyo rolling stock
Kisha Seizo multiple units